The 2016 GCI Great Alaska Shootout was the 38th Great Alaska Shootout, the annual college basketball tournament that features colleges from all over the United States. All games were played at the Alaska Airlines Center in Anchorage, Alaska. The event took place November 23 through November 26, 2016 with eight schools participating in the men's tournament and four in the women's tournament. The men's first round, semifinals, and championship game were televised on CBS Sports Network. Iona won the men's tournament, defeating Nevada 75–73. In the women's tournament, USC defeated Portland.

Brackets

Men's

Women's

References

Great Alaska Shootout
Great Alaska Shootout
Great Alaska Shootout
2016 in sports in Alaska
November 2016 sports events in the United States